A coronation crown is a crown used by a monarch when being crowned. In some monarchies, monarchs have or had a number of crowns for different occasions, such as a coronation crown for the moment of coronation and a state  crown for general usage in state ceremonial.

List of famous coronation crowns

See also
 Circlet
 Consort crown
 Imperial crown
 Royal crown
 State crown

References

Crowns (headgear)
State ritual and ceremonies
crown